Sanjana is a common Indian female name. It may refer to:

People
 Sanjana Sanghi (1996- ) , Indian actress and model
 Sanjana Kapoor (1967- ), Indian actress
 Sanjana Singh (1986- ), India film actress
 Sanjana Sarathy (1993- ) , Indian actress and model
 Sanjjanaa Galrani (1989- ), Indian model and actress
 Sanjana Anand (1995- )), Indian actress
 Sanjana Santosh (1997- ), badminton player
 Sanjana Gandhi (1995- ), Indian actress
 Sanjana Agri, Indian politician
 Sanjana (actress), Indian actress

See also
Sanjna, A Hindu goddess

Indian feminine given names